The Waikouaiti River is found to the north of Dunedin in Otago, New Zealand. It flows to the Pacific Ocean at Karitane, close to the town of Waikouaiti.

The Waikouaiti River is the largest in East Otago.

References 

Rivers of Otago
Rivers of New Zealand